Frank Magee (May 14, 1889 – February 19, 1971) was an American film editor.

Partial filmography

 Alias the Doctor (1932)
 The Singer of Naples (1935)
 Smart Blonde (1937)
 Dance, Charlie, Dance (1937)
 The Adventurous Blonde (1937)
 Nancy Drew, Detective (1938)
 Over the Wall (1938)
 Broadway Musketeers (1938)
 Mystery House (1938)
 Mr. Bill (1938)
 Smashing the Money Ring (1939)
 Sweepstakes Winner (1939)
 Everybody's Hobby (1939)
 Devil's Island (1939)
 Calling All Husbands (1940)
 Murder in the Air (1940)
 Always a Bride (1940)
 Father is a Prince (1940)
 Money and the Woman (1940)
 Father's Son (1941)
 International Squadron (1941)
 You're in the Army Now (1941)
 Strange Alibi (1941)
 Across the Pacific (1942)
 I Was Framed (1942)
 You Can't Escape Forever (1942)
 The Desert Song (1943)
 Christmas in Connecticut (1945)
 Danger Signal (1945)
 The Beast with Five Fingers (1946)
 Love and Learn (1947)
 Whiplash (1948)
 The Big Punch (1948)
 Flaxy Martin (1949)
 Colt .45 (1950)
 This Side of the Law (1950)
 Return of the Frontiersman (1950)
 The Great Jewel Robber (1950)

External links

1889 births
1971 deaths
American film editors
People from Dallas County, Missouri